Camel is an American brand of cigarettes, currently owned and manufactured by the R. J. Reynolds Tobacco Company in the United States and by Japan Tobacco outside the U.S.

Most recently Camel cigarettes contain a blend of Turkish tobacco and Virginia tobacco. Winston-Salem, North Carolina, the city where R. J. Reynolds was founded, is nicknamed "Camel City" because of the brand's popularity.

History

In 1913, Richard Joshua "R. J." Reynolds, founder of the company that still bears his name, innovated the packaged cigarette. Prior cigarette smokers had rolled their own, which tended to obscure the potential for a national market for a pre-packaged product. Reynolds worked to develop a more appealing flavor, creating the Camel cigarette, which he so named because it used Turkish tobacco in imitation of then-fashionable Egyptian cigarettes. Reynolds priced them below competitors, and within a year, he had sold 425 million packs.

Camel cigarettes were originally blended to have a milder taste than established brands. They were advance-promoted by a careful advertising campaign that included "teasers" simply stating "the Camels are coming", a play on the old Scottish folk song "The Campbells Are Coming". Another promotion was "Old Joe", a circus camel driven through towns to attract attention and distribute free cigarettes. The brand's slogan, used for decades, was "I'd walk a mile for a Camel!"

The iconic style of Camel is the original unfiltered cigarette sold in a soft pack, known as Camel Straights or Regulars. Its popularity peaked through the brand's use by famous personalities such as news broadcaster Edward R. Murrow, whose usage of them was so heavy and so public that the smoking of a Camel no-filter became his trademark.

In Europe, Camel is also a brand of cigarette rolling papers and loose cigarette tobacco, maintaining a top 20 roll-your-own rank in Northern Europe with yearly expansion into Southern and Eastern Europe according to the European Subsidiary's annual report.

In 1999, Japan Tobacco International gained ownership of the rights to sell Camel outside the United States. The tobacco blend of the non-American Camel contains less Oriental tobacco and a higher proportion of Burley.

On July 1, 2000, an "Oriental" variety of Camel was introduced, followed by Turkish Gold, a regular cigarette, in 2000, and Turkish Jade, a menthol, in 2001. In 2005 Camel added its name on the cigarette paper and changed the filter color and design on its Oriental version, which was subsequently discontinued, but then reinstated. Also in 2005, Turkish Silvers were introduced, an ultralight version positioned in strength below Turkish Gold "lights" and "full flavor" Turkish Royal. Various Camel Crush and Camel Click cigarettes have also been created and are some of the most popular Camel variants being sold.

In 2012, Camel was surpassed by Pall Mall as R. J. Reynolds' most popular brand.

In June 2012, Camel Filters were discontinued in the United Kingdom.

In 2013, Camel celebrated its 100th anniversary. Professor Robert N. Proctor of Stanford University commented on the occasion with an editorial in the Los Angeles Times, noting that over the last century, Camel sold over 4 trillion cigarettes and "have probably caused about 4 million deaths." In the same editorial, Proctor also stated that about half as many cigarettes are being sold to Americans in 2013 than in 1981.

Marketing

Graphic design

The photograph used for the Camel design was taken on September 29, 1913, by Andrew Jackson Farrell, a Winston-Salem based photographer. Farrell and Mr. R. C. Haberkern of the Reynolds Tobacco Company went to the Barnum & Bailey Circus to photograph a camel and a dromedary to use in the design for a "brand of Turkish Cigarettes which we [Reynolds Tobacco] are about to put on the market." "The label's background of temples, minarets, an oasis, and pyramids was much like it is today, but the camel in the foreground was a pathetic, one-humped beast with short, pointed ears, two-pronged hoofs and a drooping neck. Is this a camel? the Reynolds people asked each other. Consulting the "Encyclopedia Britannica", they learned that a one-humped dromedary could indeed be called a camel, although no one was too pleased with the creature's looks. Luckily, Barnum & Bailey came to town. Monday, September 29, 1913, Roy C. Haberkern, Reynolds' young secretary, went to investigate. With a photographer (Andrew Jackson Farrell), he visited the circus menagerie and found not only a dromedary, but a two-humped camel as well. When the animal's boss refused permission to photograph them, Haberkern pointed out that Reynolds had always closed offices and factories for the circus, a practice that could easily be discontinued. The trainer relented, but demanded a written release from the company. Haberkern raced back to the closed office building, climbed through a window, wrote the agreement, and signed Reynolds' name to it. Back at the fairgrounds the circus man conceded and brought out the two animals. The camel posed willingly, but Old Joe, the dromedary, wouldn't hold still. The trainer gave him a slap on the nose. Old Joe raised his tail, threw back his ears and closed his eyes as the shutter snapped. From that photograph an improved label was designed and Old Joe became the most famous dromedary in the world."

The Reynolds company commissioned Fred Otto Kleesattel in 1913 to draw the original artwork. The signature scene on most Camel cigarette packs shows a single dromedary, the smallest of the three species of camel, standing on desert sand, with pyramids and palm trees in the background. The back features bazaars and mosques. On European and some other non-U.S. versions, the desert motifs have been replaced by health warnings. On others, Kleesattel included "Manneken Pis", a historical figure of Brussels.

Known as "Fritz", Kleesattel was a highly sought after graphic designer living in Louisville, Kentucky. He was hired through his company, Klee Ad Art, to design the packaging for the new Camel cigarettes' line. Klee Ad Art was also integral in devising designs for Four Roses Distillery, Heaven Hill Distilleries, and many other now immediately recognizable U.S. brands. While serving in the U.S. Army during World War I, Kleesattel worked as a camouflage artist, disguising buildings, vehicles, and other potential targets by making them blend with their surroundings.

Ad campaigns

In an apparent attempt to counter Lucky Strike's popular "It's Toasted" campaign, Camel went in the opposite direction by boasting that Camel was a "fresh" cigarette "never parched or toasted."

In 1936, Camel used the slogan "For digestion's sake – smoke Camels." The ads ran from 1936 to 1939. In 1951, over a decade after the ad campaign ended, the FTC issued a cease-and-desist order prohibiting R. J. Reynolds Tobacco Company (RJR) from claiming that Camels aided digestion in any respect.

In 1946, Camel advertised their cigarettes as being the favorite choice among doctors "from every branch of medicine", making smokers believe it was safe to smoke them. The slogan "More doctors smoke Camels than any other cigarette" became the mainstay of Camel advertising until 1952. Ads featuring the slogan were seen in a range of media, including medical journals such as the Journal of the American Medical Association, television commercials, popular radio programs such as Abbott and Costello and magazines such as Life and Time. The slogan was claimed to be based on surveys by "three leading independent research organizations"; however, these surveys were conducted by R. J. Reynolds's advertising agency, the William Esty Company, and included free cigarettes for the doctors who were interviewed.

In late 1987, RJR created "Joe Camel" as a brand mascot. In 1991, the American Medical Association published a report stating that 5- and 6-year-olds could more easily recognize Joe Camel than Mickey Mouse, Fred Flintstone, Bugs Bunny, or even Barbie. This led the association to ask RJR to terminate the Joe Camel campaign. RJR declined, but further appeals followed in 1993 and 1994. On July 10, 1997, the Joe Camel campaign was retired and replaced with a more adult campaign which appealed to the desires of its mid-20s target market. Camel paid millions of dollars to settle lawsuits accusing them of using Joe Camel to market smoking to children.

Camel Cash
"Camel Cash", or "C-Note", was a promotional ticket stuck to the back of filtered varieties of Camel cigarettes. It was made to vaguely resemble currency and could be exchanged for items from the Camel Cash catalog. It could not be used, however, to purchase Camel tobacco products.

The artwork changed many times over the years, and in the past included the face of Joe Camel, much in the same way as presidents are featured on American currency; later designs just used a Camel silhouette like the one on the Camel logo, after Joe Camel was discontinued. Camel Cash redemption expired on March 31, 2007, angering some smokers who had been saving up the "cash" for years only to find it suddenly worthless.

Break free adventure
In 2010, R. J. Reynolds planned to sell Camel packs showing one of 10 locations to be visited by the Camel mascot, including Seattle, Washington; Austin, Texas; San Francisco; Las Vegas; New Orleans; Bonneville Salt Flats; Sturgis, South Dakota; Route 66; and the Williamsburg neighborhood of Brooklyn. The Winston-Salem package showed a tobacco field and the city's skyline, including the former R. J. Reynolds headquarters. During a 10-week period, visitors to a website were asked to guess which city would be next. Matthew Myers, president of Campaign for Tobacco-Free Kids, accused the company of targeting children once again, saying, "The new campaign cynically uses the names and images of trendy U.S. destinations ... in an attempt to make Camel cigarettes cool again." David Howard of R. J. Reynolds emphasized the campaign was geared toward adults and pointed out only adults could access the website.

New York City health commissioner Thomas Farley and the National Association of Attorneys General both sent Reynolds letters asking that the campaign be stopped. The organization said that it violated the 1998 tobacco settlement. Reynolds denied that children were being targeted and said the campaign did not go against the settlement. Other cities and states also stated their objections, including San Francisco and Seattle.

'Hidden' camel images
According to a legend, the artist who drew the image of the camel was Belgian and did not like the marketing manager of Camel so he introduced a design of Manneken Pis (a bronze statue of a very typical urinating child from Belgium). When examined closely, some people claim to see a man with an erection in the shadows on the camel's left leg. Another legend says the leg image is a nude woman. Some people claim that you can see the image of a baboon or another type of monkey on the back of the dromedary, some even say that you can see eagles near the head and a fish in the central area. It is considered unlikely that these images were drawn on purpose, rather they are the product of the shading of the drawing.

Sponsorship

Formula One

Camel was a sponsor of various Formula One teams over the years, either appearing as a major or a minor sponsor.

The logos were placed on the side of the cars, and on the drivers' helmets. In races where tobacco sponsorship was forbidden, the Camel name was replaced with the Camel logo instead.

In the early years, Camel was a small sponsor and the logos were displayed on the side of the car and on the side of the drivers' helmets only, but from the  season until the  season, Camel became the main sponsor and the logos were prominently shown on the car. In races where tobacco sponsorship was forbidden, the Camel name was either replaced with blue gaps, the Camel logo or the "Benetton" name instead.

The logos were displayed on the top of the nose section, right in the front of the driver, on the side of the car and on the drivers helmets.

The logos were prominently displayed all over the car. In races where tobacco sponsorship was forbidden, the Camel name was either replaced with "Lotus", "Courtaulds" or the Camel logo instead.

The logos were shown on the side of the car.

In 1988, the logos were displayed on the top of the car, on the front of the nose, on the top side of the rear wing and on the driver's helmets because it was a minor sponsor, but in 1989 Camel was the main sponsor and the logos were more prominently shown. In races where tobacco sponsorship was forbidden, the Camel name was replaced with the Camel logo instead.

The logos were shown on top of the car, on the top and side of the nose, right in front of the driver and on the driver's helmets. In races where tobacco sponsorship was forbidden, the Camel name was replaced with either the Camel logo or with "Williams" instead.

Paris–Dakar Rally
Camel sponsored the Camel Team of the late 1980s to early 1990s in the Paris–Dakar Rally.

Camel Trophy

Camel organised the Camel Trophy, a vehicle-oriented competition that was held annually between 1980 and 2000. It was best known for its use of Land Rover vehicles over challenging terrain.

NASCAR

Camel was a sponsor for Travis Carter Motorsports in the NASCAR Cup Series (then known as Winston Cup, named for Camel's sibling brand Winston) from 1994 until 1997. The #23 Camel Ford Thunderbird was driven by Hut Stricklin and later by Jimmy Spencer.

IMSA
From 1972 until 1993, Camel was the title sponsor of the then-popular IMSA auto racing series, titled as Camel GT.

USHRA
Camel was a sponsor of the United States Hot Rod Association. They featured the "Camel Mud & Monster Series", which ran from 1990 to 1994.

MotoGP

Camel sponsored the Sito Pons MotoGP team from 2003 until the team's departure from MotoGP racing in 2005.

In races where tobacco sponsorship was forbidden, the Camel name was replaced with "Biaggi", "Ukawa", "Tamada", "Barros", "Bayliss", and "Team" and the Camel logo was replaced with a racing bike.

Camel sponsored the Yamaha factory team in the 2006 MotoGP season, but due to European Tobacco Regulations, the company had to end their association with Yamaha at the end of the 2006 Grand Prix motorcycle racing season.

In races where tobacco sponsorship was forbidden, the Camel name was replaced with "Team" and the Camel logo was replaced with a racing bike.

Superbike
In the early to mid-1990s, Camel sponsored the factory Honda team in the AMA Superbike Championship series.

AMA Supercross
Camel was a sponsor of the AMA Supercross Championship. When it was the sponsor, the series was called the "Camel Supercross Series".

Football (soccer)
Camel was a sponsor of the 1986 FIFA World Cup.

Markets
Camel was or still is sold in the following countries:

Africa
Algeria, Egypt, Mauritius, South Africa, Tunisia, Morocco, Namibia

Asia
Turkey , Armenia, Georgia, Azerbaijan, Bangladesh, Kazakhstan, Uzbekistan, Israel, Malaysia, Syria, Qatar, United Arab Emirates, Singapore, Thailand, Myanmar, Cambodia, Maldives, Philippines, Indonesia, China, Taiwan, Hong Kong, South Korea, Japan, Vietnam, Kuwait, India, Pakistan, Iran, Lebanon

Europe
Bosnia & Herzegovina, Croatia, Cyprus, Ireland, United Kingdom, Luxembourg, Belgium, Netherlands, Norway, Sweden, Finland, Denmark, Germany, France, Switzerland, Austria, Portugal, Spain, Italy, San Marino, Poland, Hungary, Czech Republic, Slovakia, Romania, Moldova, Serbia , Slovenia, North Macedonia, Albania, Bulgaria, Greece, Estonia, Latvia, Lithuania, Russia , Belarus, Ukraine, Malta, Kosovo

North America
Aruba, British Virgin Islands, Canada, Cuba, Mexico, United States

Oceania
Australia, New Zealand

South America
Argentina, Bolivia, Brazil, Colombia, Paraguay, Peru

Central America
Costa Rica, Nicaragua

See also
 Egyptian cigarette industry
 Camel Trophy

References

External links

 

R. J. Reynolds Tobacco Company brands
Products introduced in 1913
American brands